Taina Bofferding (born 22 November 1982) is a Luxembourgish politician who serves as the Minister of the Interior and of Equality between Men and Women under the Government of Xavier Bettel. 

After high school at Hubert-Clément High School in Esch-sur-Alzette, her hometown, she first studied as an educator at the Luxembourg Institute of Educational and Social Studies (IEES), from which she graduated in 2005, then studied in social sciences at the University of Trier which gives her the title of Master in Social Sciences in 2011.

A member of the Luxembourg Socialist Workers Party (LSAP) since 2004, she was Vice-President of the Alliance of Humanists and Atheists (AHA) from 2010 to 2018, which seeks to separate the socio-political and religious domains more radically.

Since 5 December 2013 until 30 October 2018 she was member of the Chamber of Deputies. She stood for the reelection in the 2018 Luxembourg general election but just missed getting a direct mandate. She was also member of the city council of Esch-sur-Alzette between 2011 and 2018.

References

1982 births
Living people
Women government ministers of Luxembourg
Members of the Chamber of Deputies (Luxembourg)
University of Trier alumni
People from Esch-sur-Alzette
21st-century Luxembourgian women politicians
21st-century Luxembourgian politicians
Councillors in Esch-sur-Alzette
Luxembourg Socialist Workers' Party politicians
Female interior ministers